Achatodes is a genus of moths of the family Noctuidae.

Species
 Achatodes juanae Schaus, 1894
 Achatodes zeae (Harris, 1841) – elder shoot borer moth

References
 Achatodes at Markku Savela's Lepidoptera and Some Other Life Forms
 

 
Apameini
Noctuoidea genera
Taxa named by Achille Guenée